Hrishikesh Tamuli (born 17 July 1995) is an Indian cricketer. He made his Twenty20 debut for Assam in the 2018–19 Syed Mushtaq Ali Trophy on 2 March 2019. He made his List A debut on 25 September 2019, for Assam in the 2019–20 Vijay Hazare Trophy.

References

External links
 

1995 births
Living people
Indian cricketers
Assam cricketers
Place of birth missing (living people)